Nasir Hossain is the name of:

Nasir Hossain, a Bangladeshi cricketer born on 30 November, 1991.
Nasir Hossain (Sylhet cricketer), a different cricketer from Bangladesh